Gobernadora is a corregimiento in Montijo District, Veraguas Province, Panama with a population of 269 as of 2010. Its population as of 1990 was 1,785; its population as of 2000 was 1,114.

References

Corregimientos of Veraguas Province